The Maritsa Hotel is a Bulgarian four-star hotel, located in Plovdiv.

Description
It is situated on the northern bank of the Maritsa river, facing the International Fair Plovdiv across the Tsar Boris III Boulevard, in the city's northern district.

The hotel has 47 single rooms, 87 double rooms and 18 flats.

See also 

 Novotel Plovdiv

External links 
 Official site of the Maritsa Hotel

Year of establishment missing
Hotels in Plovdiv